Kang Se-jung (born January 15, 1982) is a South Korean actress. She made her entertainment debut as a singer for the K-pop girl group Papaya in 2000; the group released two albums before disbanding in 2001. Kang began acting full-time in 2004, and has appeared in television series such as Assorted Gems (2009) and Heartless City (2013). Upon turning to acting, she used the stage name Go Na-eun before reverting to use of her birth name in 2017.

Filmography

Television series

Film

Music video

Television show

Theater

Discography

Awards

References

External links

Go Na-eun at Wayz Company

South Korean film actresses
South Korean stage actresses
South Korean television actresses
South Korean female idols
Living people
1982 births
L&Holdings artists